Felix Heinemann (born 10 December 1996) is a German coxswain. He won a gold medal at the 2015 World Rowing Championships in Aiguebelette with the lightweight men's eight.

References

1996 births
Living people
German male rowers
World Rowing Championships medalists for Germany
Coxswains (rowing)